Estadio Teodoro Lolo Fernández is a stadium in Lima, Peru, built in the 1950s and opened on July 20, 1952. It is owned by GREMCO S.A. formerly was owned by the football club Universitario de Deportes, being their first stadium; one stand in the west for 4,000 spectators brought from the Estadio Nacional. The inauguration game saw Universitario play Universidad de Chile where they won 4-2; Lolo Fernández scored three goals. Universitario then bought a stand from the Peruvian Basketball Federation which served as the northern stand; capacity of 5,000 spectators. They finally built the eastern stand for a capacity of 6,000 spectators. This reached a maximum capacity of 15,000. However the Estadio Lolo Fernández was not used for more important games. The club chose to move those high-risk games to the Estadio Nacional which, at the time, had a capacity of 48,000.

In 2000, the Estadio Lolo Fernández was replaced as the main venue for Universitario's First Division football games by the newer Estadio Monumental "U" which has a capacity of 80,093 seats. Afterwards, the eastern and southern stands of Estadio Lolo Fernández were removed.

The Estadio Lolo Fernández now serves as a football academy for the club's members and hosts games for the youth teams such as América Cochahuayco which currently participates in Peru's Second Division league. The only stand left in the stadium is the western one known as Occidente. The current capacity is now 4,000 seats. In June 2009, work started to replace the natural grass soccer turf with FIFA 2 Star grade synthetic grass.

References

Teodoro Lolo Fernandez
Club Universitario de Deportes
Sports venues in Lima
Sports venues completed in 1952
1952 establishments in Peru